Ernest Henry Stenning MBE TD (27 January 1885 – 2 February 1964) was an  Anglican priest. He was the Archdeacon of Man in the Church of England from 1958 until his death in 1964.

Born in Shermanbury, Sussex, Stenning was educated at Downing College, Cambridge, and ordained in 1911. By profession a science teacher, he taught from 1911 at King Williams College, where he was also school chaplain and Vice-Principal.  An Honorary Chaplain to the Queen, he was president of the Manx Antiquarian Society, a co-founder of the Manx Grand Prix and a Provincial Grand Master of the Isle of Man Freemasons (1957–1964).

References

1885 births
People from Shermanbury
Alumni of Downing College, Cambridge
Honorary Chaplains to the Queen
Archdeacons of Man
Members of the Order of the British Empire
Freemasons of the United Grand Lodge of England
1964 deaths